Chauler Fort is a small fort located  north of Nashik, in the Indian state of Maharashtra. This fort can be visited in a day from Nashik. The nearest town is Satana.

History
The history is similar to the Salher and Mulher forts. The fort was ruled by King Gawali. This fort was under the control of Maratha empire until it was captured by British forces in 1818.

Places to see
The fort is located on a high tableland with escarpments on all the sides. There is a statue of Chauranganath on the fort, whose village fair is held every year on Pithuri Amavasya which comes in August every year. There are three entrance gates and 4 rock cut water tanks on the fort. The gates are good example of marvelous architecture. The interior building and the fortification is lying in ruins

See also
 List of forts in Maharashtra
 List of forts in India
 Marathi People
 List of Maratha dynasties and states
 Maratha War of Independence
 Battles involving the Maratha Empire

References

Buildings and structures of the Maratha Empire
Forts in Maharashtra
Forts in Nashik district
16th-century forts in India
Caves of Maharashtra
Tourist attractions in Nashik
Indian rock-cut architecture
Tourist attractions in Maharashtra